Bettadahosahalli  is a village in the South Indian state of Karnataka. It is located in the Nelamangala taluk of Bangalore Rural district.

Demographics 
Bettadahosahalli had population of 87 of which 39 are males while 48 are females as per report released by Census India 2011.

Geography 
The total geographical area of village is 116.00 hectares.

Bus Route from Bengaluru City 
Yeshwantapura - Dasarahalli - Nelamangala

See also 

 Bugadihalli
 Bengaluru Rural District

References

External links 

Villages in Bangalore Rural district